The Fantastic Plastic Machine is the debut studio album by Japanese musician Fantastic Plastic Machine. It was released on October 10, 1997, by Readymade Records. The album was subsequently released in Germany on April 24, 1998, by Bungalow Records and in the United States on September 15, 1998, by Emperor Norton Records.

His debut album drew influence and inspiration from music styles—including baroque pop, bossa nova, beat, and europop, as well as his dance music roots. The album's cover art was illustrated by French-Armenian cartoonist and illustrator Edmond Kiraz.

Critical reception

Steve Huey of AllMusic described The Fantastic Plastic Machine as "a delightful, infectious album that's not only hooky as all get-out, but also rewards repeated listening", deeming it "one of the best albums to come out of the Japanese club-pop movement".

In 2007, Rolling Stone Japan placed The Fantastic Plastic Machine at number 67 on its list of the "100 Greatest Japanese Rock Albums of All Time". In 2011, the album was included in LA Weeklys "beginner's guide" to Shibuya-kei music. Tokyo Weekender writer Ed Cunningham later cited it as a "groundbreaking" Shibuya-kei release, noting: "Some post-Shibuya-kei artists would follow in the footsteps of the guitar-driven indie pop of Flipper's Guitar, but many more significant acts, in genres such as picopop and electropop, would expand upon the electronica initiated by [Fantastic Plastic Machine]."

Track listing

The German LP edition (total length: 45:25) follows the track order of the original Japanese edition, but substitutes "Fantastic Plastic World" with "Fantastic Plastic World (Voice 'n' Baroque)" and omits "Allen Ginsberg".

References

External links
 

1997 debut albums
Fantastic Plastic Machine (musician) albums
Nippon Columbia albums
Emperor Norton Records albums